A crosier, or crozier, is the stylized staff of office carried by high-ranking Roman Catholic, Eastern Orthodox, Anglican, some Lutheran, and Pentecostal prelates.

Crosier or Crozier may also refer to:

Places
 Crozier (crater), a lunar crater
 Crozier, Virginia, USA, an unincorporated community
 Crozier, Arizona, USA, a census-designated place
 Cape Crozier, the most easterly point of Ross Island in Antarctica
 Crozier Island, off the northwest coast of Greenland

Other uses
 Crozier (surname)
 Crosiers, general name for several similar Roman Catholic orders
 Crozier (mycology), an anatomical feature of many fungi in the phylum Ascomycota
 Crozier, another name for fiddlehead fern, a furled frond of a young fern